Parvulastra is a genus of starfish belonging to the family Asterinidae. The species of this genus are found in Southern Hemisphere.

The genus shows an unusual reproductive mode within Asterinidae: Parvulastra parvivipara and Parvulastra vivipara are viviparous. Prior to their description as distinct species, they were considered variants of Parvulastra exigua, which has free-living (but non-feeding) larvae.

Species
There are five species:
Parvulastra calcarata 
Parvulastra dyscrita 
Parvulastra exigua 
Parvulastra parvivipara 
Parvulastra vivipara

References

Asterinidae
Asteroidea genera